The Alstonville Cricket Club was founded in 1876.

With the establishment of the LJ Hooker League in 1994/95 the first-grade side now competes at a regional level, with the lower grades still playing in Ballina competition.

Alstonville have won the L J Hooker League on two occasions: 2001/02 and 2016/17.

References

External links
 Alstonville & District Cricket Club on Facebook

Sources

1876 establishments in Australia
Cricket clubs established in 1876
Ballina Shire
Cricket in New South Wales
Australian club cricket teams